Bert Jacobus Martinus Selen (born 30 August 1985) is a Dutch music producer, composer, multi-instrumentalist and songwriter based in Los Angeles. His scoring work includes the primetime Internationally Syndicated TV show "Rules of Engagement",(Sony/CBS), "Fast Layne" (Disney Channel),"Raven's Home" (Disney Channel), "K.C. Undercover" (Disney Channel), "Lab Rats" (Disney), "Lab Rats: Elite Force" (Disney), "Mystery Girls" (ABC Family) and “Power Rangers Dino Fury” (Nickelodeon & Netflix). His music has been featured in a variety of TV shows, including: "Parks and Recreation" (NBC), “NCIS Los Angeles” (CBS), "The Mentalist" (CBS), “Gossip Girl” (CW), “Awkward” (MTV), “Finding Carter” (MTV), Trailers: “Danny Collins” (Al Pacino), Advertising: “American Music Awards” (E! Network), Verizon, Vogue, Logitech, Head & Shoulders, as well as in Video Games “WET” (Artificial Mind and Movement/Bethesda Softworks) Stage productions “The Pee-Wee Herman show on Broadway” (HBO), and “Pee-Wee Herman live at the Nokia Theatre”.

Early life

Selen was born in Kessel-Eik, The Netherlands.

Musical career

At age 17, Selen he moved to the United States with his former band. Selen assumed producer duties on their first record. As interest for his services mounted, he started working with local and international acts. Broadening his focus to include the TV and film business, his songs appeared on national primetime shows such as “Parks and Recreation" (NBC) and "The Mentalist" (CBS). At age 23, his work on "Rules of Engagement" (Sony/CBS) earned him a BMI Film & Television Awards for "Composing for a Top Grossing Prime Time Television Show", being the youngest composer in the room.

In 2009 he provided original music for the “Artificial Mind and Movement" video game "WET"

Selen composed and produced songs for Pee-Wee Herman's comeback shows on Broadway and at the Nokia Theatre in Los Angeles, produced and recorded a rendition of Mr. Big's "To Be with You" with the "Rules of Engagement" cast, and started composing the music for the new Disney Live-action comedy series "Lab Rats". He also scored music for "X-Japan's" Sankyo promotional video's.

Selen co-wrote, produced and mixed the debut album for “Fire in the Hamptons”, a Los Angeles-based Electro-pop group.

Selen operates his Music production company in North Hollywood, CA.

Equipment

Selen is Endorsed by Adams Drums, and Line 6.

References

External links
 
 bertselen.com

1985 births
Living people
Dutch record producers
Dutch songwriters
Dutch multi-instrumentalists
People from Peel en Maas